Southern Christian College is an independent non-denominational Christian co-educational primary and secondary day school located in Kingston, Tasmania providing education from kinder to year 12, as well as providing early learning services as Kingston Early Learning Centre. Southern Christian College was founded in 1986. Since 2014 it has been an International Baccalaureate world school, teaching the IB curriculum from age 2 (early learning) to year 10.

It is a ministry of CityLight Church, which is located on the same property. The school is a member of Christian Schools Australia and Independent Schools Tasmania. Until 2015 it taught kinder-year 10, when it received authorisation to start year 11 and 12 in 2016.

Indonesian program
The school is part of the Australia-Asia BRIDGE program, and is sistered with SMA Muhammadiyah 1 Denpasar in Indonesia, a Muslim private school in Bali. The school has taught Indonesian as a compulsory subject from early learning (pre-kindergarten) to year 10 since 1998 as part of the NALSSP and it is an Asia Access School. It received a visit from the Indonesian Ambassador to Australia in 2013.

References

1986 establishments in Australia
Educational institutions established in 1986
Private secondary schools in Hobart
Private primary schools in Hobart
International Baccalaureate schools in Australia
Nondenominational Christian schools in Hobart
Kingston, Tasmania